The House of Assembly of Saint Vincent and the Grenadines is the unicameral legislature of Saint Vincent and the Grenadines.

The House has a total of 23 members:

 Fifteen represent single member constituencies and are elected using plurality voting, also known as "first past the post".
 Six are known as senators, and are appointed by the Governor-General. Four senators are appointed to represent the government and two to represent the opposition.
 One member is the attorney-general, who is appointed
 One member is the speaker, who is elected by the government members of the House, in consultation with the Opposition.

The most recent elections to the House of Assembly were held on 05 November 2020. The incumbent Unity Labour Party (ULP) was returned to office for an unprecedented fifth consecutive term, winning nine (9) out of fifteen (15) seats. The New Democratic Party (NDP) won the remaining six seats and formed the opposition.

See also 
 List of speakers of the House of Assembly of Saint Vincent and the Grenadines
 Politics of Saint Vincent and the Grenadines
 List of legislatures by country

References

External links 
 

Politics of Saint Vincent and the Grenadines
Political organisations based in Saint Vincent and the Grenadines
Saint Vincent and the Grenadines
Government of Saint Vincent and the Grenadines
Saint Vincent and the Grenadines
Buildings and structures in Kingstown